Colin Edwards II (born February 27, 1974), nicknamed the "Texas Tornado", is an American former professional motorcycle racer who retired half-way through the 2014 season, but continues in the sport as a factory test rider. He is a two-time World Superbike champion and competed in the MotoGP class from 2003 to 2014.

Early years 
Edwards was born in Conroe, Texas. At the age of three, his Australian father, Colin Edwards Sr. (an amateur motorcycle racer himself), introduced him to a minibike, and Edwards entered his first motocross race at the age of four. Over the next ten years, Edwards became one of the top-ranked junior motocross competitors in the US, winning dozens of races in the 50cc to 80cc categories in local, regional and national events.

In 1988 at the age of 14, Edwards stopped competing in motocross races, having become distracted by the normal demands of being a teenager. However, in 1990, Edwards and his father attended a motorcycle road race event in north Texas, and this inspired him to attempt road racing.

In 1991 Edwards began competing in amateur road-racing events locally, but rapidly progressed to national events. He was undefeated in every amateur event he entered that year, and won numerous national amateur titles. His performance was sufficiently impressive for him to be offered a sponsored ride with South West Motorsports, and Edwards turned professional just before the commencement of the 1992 season.

Career 
In his first professional season (1992), Edwards entered the AMA 250cc National Series. He won five of the nine races and the national title over second-place earner Kenny Roberts, Jr. In 1993 and 1994 Edwards rode for Vance & Hines on a Yamaha in the AMA Superbike Championship, earning 6th and 5th place overall in those years.

Superbike World Championship 
In  Edwards was offered a factory position with Yamaha in the Superbike World Championship. In  he achieved a greatly improved sixth overall in the Superbike World championship.

 was a disappointing year for Edwards as he was forced to withdraw from competing due to injuries sustained in the fifth round of the Superbike World Championship. He was replaced in the Yamaha World Superbike Team and was unable to negotiate a position in the 500cc Grand Prix competition. Fortunately Edwards was able to conclude a deal with Honda to ride the RC45 motorcycle in the  Superbike World Championship. Edwards finished fifth overall that year, and earned his first solo international victories with a double win at Monza followed by his 3rd win of the season at Brands Hatch.

In , Edwards managed several more victories for Honda (including leading teammate Aaron Slight home twice at Brands Hatch, giving Honda a rare Double-1-2) and ended the season in second overall position, behind champion Carl Fogarty. In , Edwards rode the new Honda VTR-1000 SP1/RC51 twin cylinder motorcycle to overall victory in the Superbike World Championship after Yamaha rider and points leader, Noriyuki Haga was disqualified for testing positive for a banned substance. Edwards also holds the record for the most points in a single season with 552 points in 2002 breaking the previous record of 489 points set by Carl Fogarty in 1999. Runner-up Troy Bayliss also broke the previous record with 541 points.

MotoGP World Championship 
After winning his 2nd Superbike World Championship Edwards moved to MotoGP in 2003. He rode for the greatly troubled Aprilia team on the RS Cube, and his only notable accomplishment in that otherwise dismal year was avoiding serious injury when his machine caught fire due to an incorrectly fitted fuel cap at Sachsenring. Yet Edwards, known in all motorcycle paddocks as a great bike tester, tried to no avail to help lift the struggling team.

2004 saw Edwards riding for Telefonica Movistar Honda, and he achieved his first MotoGP podium position at Donington. Edwards finished the season in fifth overall position.

In 2005, Edwards moved to Gauloises Yamaha factory team as the teammate to the world champion Valentino Rossi. His best result for 2005 was a second position at Laguna Seca, behind compatriot Nicky Hayden. He finished the season fourth overall.

2006 
For 2006 Colin Edwards continued riding for the Camel Yamaha factory team on board the YZR-M1 with teammate and good friend Valentino Rossi in the MotoGP championship. The factory Yamaha team had a troubling start to their racing year with "chatter" problems and tire wear issues.

The factory team built a new chassis for the 2006 spec YZR-M1 to combat the aforementioned problems.  Rossi took to the new chassis quickly and rode to victory at his home race of Mugello for the fifth consecutive time since 2001. Edwards did not have the time to "gel" with the new chassis early in the season, which resulted in him sticking with the older version for the Mugello race. He finished 12th.

At Assen he took the lead at the start, and led until Nicky Hayden passed him on the penultimate lap. He caught back up to his countryman on the last lap, and managed to pass him a few corners from the end. When Hayden attempted to pass him again in the final chicane, Edwards ran across the AstroTurf and lost control of his bike, which briefly continued on without him. He remounted to finish 13th. Hayden, who ran across the gravel on the final chicane himself, managed to keep control of his bike and won the race. At his home race, the Red Bull U.S. Grand Prix, Edwards finished ninth suffering tire problems in the scorching heat like his teammate Valentino Rossi. At Estoril he qualified second and finished fourth in one of his most competitive showings of the season.

2007 
2007 brought great prospects early on. Colin entered his second of a two-year deal with Yamaha factory team, now known as Fiat Yamaha riding the new Yamaha YZR-M1 800cc. Yet after starting second on the grid in Istanbul, a first lap crash caused by Olivier Jacque took him out. At Le Mans Colin took pole position, but made a slow start and gambled on switching to wet tyres in damp conditions. He did this too early, and by the time it was wet enough his tyres had shredded, forcing him to pit again and finish at the back of the field.

Fiat Yamaha was having problems with the M1 and the Michelin tires, Edwards along with teammate Valentino Rossi both struggled to find competitive set up nearly the entire season to run up front. Edwards best result of the season was 2nd (equaling his career best in MotoGP) at the wet British Grand Prix at Donington Park.

2008 

For the 2008 season, Colin Edwards continued in MotoGP, this time for the satellite Tech3 Yamaha team alongside fellow Superbike World Champion James Toseland. A series of solid performances left him 5th in the overall standings after nine rounds, never qualifying lower than 6th on the grid and finishing on the podium twice. After qualifying 6th for round 9 at Assen, he was delayed by Rossi's early crash and was in next to last place at the end of the first lap (in front of only Rossi, who was able to rejoin the race), however he then fought back to snatch 3rd from Nicky Hayden at the final corner after Hayden ran out of fuel, gaining a measure of revenge for the 2006 race at the track. Colin Edwards results started to suffer after a crash in Germany. In the next four races Edwards failed to break the top ten and his best result since the podium at Assen was a sixth place at the final round of the season at Valencia.

Edwards confirmed that he had signed for Tech3 for yet another season. "It is no secret that I had agreed with Yamaha to finish my MotoGP career at the end of 2008 and continue my racing career with them in America, but as soon as I began working with the Tech3 team I instantly formed a great relationship with my guys."
Therefore, Edwards will once again be riding for Tech3 Yamaha in 2009 as he searches for his first MotoGP victory.

2009 

Edwards once again demonstrated consistent form in the 2009 MotoGP season, establishing himself as the strongest satellite rider in the championship. He secured a second-place finish in the British Grand Prix at Donington Park.

After being caught in a crash at the San Marino Grand Prix, Edwards directed typically outspoken criticism towards Alex de Angelis, claiming: "We are in Italy and occasionally you have to deal with an Italian rider who wants to be a hero and today that was De Angelis. De Angelis is the guy who needed to be wearing Valentino’s donkey helmet," in reference to a special edition helmet being worn by Valentino Rossi.

2010 
On October 1, 2009 Edwards announced that he had signed a one-year contract extension that would see him ride for Tech3 Yamaha in the  season. His teammate will be fellow American Ben Spies.

2011 

On September 19, 2010, Edwards signed a one-year contract extension to ride for Tech3 Yamaha in the  season, partnering Cal Crutchlow.

At the Catalan Grand Prix, Edwards broke his right collarbone during second practice, which successfully had a plate added. Nine days later, and in his first race since injury, Edwards took a third-place finish at the British Grand Prix at Silverstone, having been promoted to a podium placing after accidents for Jorge Lorenzo and Marco Simoncelli. It was his first podium finish since a second-place result at the 2009 British Grand Prix at Donington Park.

On October 23, along with Valentino Rossi, Edwards was involved in the accident that killed Marco Simoncelli at the Malaysian Grand Prix, injuring his left shoulder and ending his season. Josh Hayes replaced him for Valencia.

2012 
The team was making their re-entry to the premier class under the new Claiming Rule Teams regulations with a Suter chassis powered by a BMW engine.

2013 
Remaining with Forward Racing for 2013, Edwards was partnered with rookie Claudio Corti on FTR-Kawasaki machinery.

2014 

Edwards again remained with Forward Racing for 2014, this time partnering Aleix Espargaró on Yamaha-based machines. At a press conference prior to the 2014 Motorcycle Grand Prix of the Americas, Edwards announced that the 2014 season will be his final MotoGP season, citing the struggle to adapt to a different riding style. It was stated after the Indianapolis round, that he would not compete in the second half of the season, and was replaced by Alex de Angelis. During commentary for the British MotoGP round at Silverstone on August 31, 2014, Edwards revealed he will be a test rider for Yamaha and Michelin for the next two years.

Suzuka 8 Hours 
In 1996, Edwards teamed with Noriyuki Haga to claim victory in the Suzuka 8 Hours endurance race riding a Yamaha, his first international victory.  Edwards won the 8 Hours two more times: in 2001 with Valentino Rossi, and in 2002 with the late Daijiro Kato, both times with Honda.

Other racing activities 
Edwards has twice represented the United States in the Michelin Race of Champions Nation's Cup, first in 2000 and again in 2002 when the US team won the event.  The competition involves a national team that includes an automobile racer, a rally/off-road driver and a motorcycle racer.  The 2002 US team included former off-road racer and NASCAR rookie Jimmie Johnson as the rally driver, and four-time NASCAR champion Jeff Gordon in the automobile category.

Broadcasting 
Following the end of his racing career, Edwards joined British MotoGP broadcaster BT Sport in 2016 as a pundit in their pre- and post-race programming.

Texas Tornado Boot Camp 
The Colin Edwards Texas Tornado Boot Camp or TTBC is a world class motorcycle training facility built on a  plot of land near Lake Conroe. It is a premier training facility for those new to riding, motorcycle enthusiasts, as well as professionals looking to polish up on their skills. TTBC offers a wide range of moto training and events including 1&2 day camps, private camps, Dirt Wars, racers camps and The Colin Edwards 4 day Experience. The  "Colin Edwards Experience" is a 4-day camp with Edwards himself involved in the training, including time on the 500yard gun range.

Training facilities 
TTBC includes a  dirt oval, covered TT track with lights for night riding, open TT track, 500-yard gun range, Mini Bike MX Track, and a  bunk house and classroom facility.

Career statistics

Superbike World Championship

By season

Races by year 
(key) (Races in bold indicate pole position, races in italics indicate fastest lap)

Grand Prix motorcycle racing

By season

By class

Races by year 
(key) (Races in bold indicate pole position, races in italics indicate fastest lap)

References

External links 

 Colin Edwards – MotoGP Rider Bios at Motorcycle-USA
 Texas Tornado Boot Camp Texas Tornado Boot Camp Motorcycle Training Camp

1974 births
Living people
American motorcycle racers
Yamaha Motor Racing MotoGP riders
Superbike World Championship riders
Sportspeople from Houston
American people of Australian descent
People from Conroe, Texas
Conroe High School alumni
Tech3 MotoGP riders
Gresini Racing MotoGP riders
MotoGP World Championship riders